Don Patterson may refer to:

Don Patterson (American football coach) (born 1950), college football coach
Don Patterson (defensive back) (born 1957), former American football player
Don Patterson (animator) (1909–1998), American animator and director
Don Patterson (organist) (1936–1988), American jazz organist
Donald D. Patterson (1911–1972), businessman and political figure in New Brunswick, Canada
Donald Patterson (Pennsylvania politician) (1935/1936–2016), Inspector General of Pennsylvania
Donald J. Patterson (born 1972), American professor of computer science

See also
Donald Paterson (disambiguation)